Felícia Leirner (1904–1996) was a Polish-born Brazilian sculptor. She was born in Warsaw and arrived in Brazil in 1927. At the age of 44, she began studying sculpture with the photographer Victor Brecheret . Her early work belonged to the figurative phase (1950–58). She initially created isolated figures. In 1953 and 1955, she participated in the São Paulo Art Biennial. In 1955, she received an award from the Museum of Modern Art, Rio de Janeiro. Her sculptures were incorporated into the collections of the São Paulo Museum of Art and the Musée d'Art Moderne de la Ville de Paris. She died in Campos do Jordão, São Paulo in 1996.

References

External links
Felícia Leirner biography on the Museu Felícia Leirner website

1904 births
1996 deaths
Artists from Warsaw
Polish emigrants to Brazil
Polish women sculptors
Brazilian women sculptors
20th-century Polish women artists
20th-century Polish sculptors
20th-century Brazilian sculptors